Marcán mac Tommáin (died 653) was the 15th king of the Uí Maine.

In his time the Uí Maine were allied and subject to the Ui Fiachrach Aidhne, a branch of the Connachta. They were ruled by Guaire Aidne mac Colmáin. The annals record that Marcán was slain in a battle in Airthir Seola by Cenn Fáelad mac Colgan and Máenach mac Báethíne of the Ui Briun in 653. The Annals of Ulster refer to it as a battle of the Connachta. Guaire's brother Loingsech mac Colmáin was ruling at this time and was being challenged by the Ui Briun.

Notes

References

 Annals of Ulster at CELT: Corpus of Electronic Texts at University College Cork
 Annals of Tigernach at CELT: Corpus of Electronic Texts at University College Cork
Revised edition of McCarthy's synchronisms at Trinity College Dublin.
 Byrne, Francis John (2001), Irish Kings and High-Kings, Dublin: Four Courts Press,

External links
 Commentary by Dan M. Wiley (The Cycles of the Kings Web Project)

People from County Galway
People from County Roscommon
653 deaths
7th-century Irish monarchs
Year of birth unknown
Kings of Uí Maine